He Laughed Last is a 1956 Technicolor comedy film by Blake Edwards. Edwards adapted the film for his 1999 off-Broadway show, Big Rosemary starring Cady Huffman in the Lucy Marlow role from the original.

Plot

A Runyonesque Roaring 20s musical comedy about a show girl who circumstance casts as an unlikely mob boss.

Cast
 Frankie Laine as Gino Lupo
 Lucy Marlow as Rosemary 'Rosie' Lebeau
 Anthony Dexter as Dominic Rodríguez
 Richard Long as Jimmy Murphy
 Alan Reed as Big Dan Hennessy
 Jesse White as Max Lassiter
 Florenz Ames as George Eagle
 Henry Slate as Ziggy

See also
List of American films of 1956

References

External links 
 
 
 
 

1956 films
Films directed by Blake Edwards
Columbia Pictures films
1950s musical comedy-drama films
American musical comedy-drama films
1950s romantic comedy-drama films
American romantic comedy-drama films
1950s romantic musical films
Films with screenplays by Blake Edwards
1956 comedy films
1956 drama films
American romantic musical films
1950s English-language films
1950s American films